Naboo is a fictional planet in the Star Wars universe. A bountiful world with a mostly green terrain, the planet was the homeworld of two independent societies: the native Gungans, who dwelt in underwater cities, and the human Naboo, who lived in colonies dispersed among the surface. The human denizens of Naboo, known simply as the Naboo, were governed under an elective monarchy and maintained a peaceful culture that promoted education, the arts, environmental protection and scientific achievements. The primary Naboo city was Theed, the planetary capital, and the primary Gungan city was Otoh Gunga. Naboo is known to be orbited by three moons: within the current canon, Naboo's moons are known as Ohma-D'un, Onoam, and Veruna; while in Legends, Naboo was known to be orbited by the moons Ohma-D'un (home to a Gungan colony), Rori (home to a Naboo colony), and the ice moon Tasia (named for Queen Elsinoré den Tasia of Grizmallt).

Located in the Chommell sector, Naboo is the home planet of Senator Padmé Amidala and Representative Jar Jar Binks, as well as Senator (later Supreme Chancellor and then Emperor) Palpatine. In Star Wars: Episode I – The Phantom Menace, it was the site of a blockade by the Trade Federation and the Battle of Naboo between the Federation and the native inhabitants. Naboo is seen in four films in the Star Wars series, having a prominent role in the first two prequels and glimpsed briefly in Revenge of the Sith and the 2004 DVD release of Return of the Jedi.

Theed's architecture, while referencing Ancient Rome and other classical traditions, was heavily inspired by the Frank Lloyd Wright-designed Marin County Civic Center in California, located near Skywalker Ranch and Industrial Light & Magic. The swamps of Naboo are home to many species of creatures including the massive Opee Sea Killer in Star Wars: Episode I – The Phantom Menace.

Naboo system

The Naboo system is located in the Chommell sector, a region in the galactic Mid-Rim.  Naboo is the third planet of the star system of the same name, which orbits the star Naboo.  The Naboo system comprises five planets: Moth (Venus type), Erep (Venus type), Naboo (Earth type), Widow (Mars type) and Storm (Jupiter type).  The planet Naboo has three moons, known throughout various media as Ohma D'un, Rori and Tasia.

Geographic features

Naboo is described as having a porous, plasma-rich interior without a molten core—a rare phenomenon among the planets in the Star Wars universe. The surface of Naboo is covered by dense swamps, rolling grass plains, and verdant hills. The largest mountain chain, the Gallo Mountains, bisect the singular continent and divide the great grass plains of the north from the Lianorm Swamp in the south. South of the Lianorm Swamp is Paonga Sea, where at the bottom lies the main Gungan settlement of Otoh Gunga, the Gungan city where Jar Jar Binks leads Obi-Wan Kenobi and Qui-Gon Jinn. Underneath the planet's surface is a tremendous maze of passages and caves, home to immense aquatic animals and creatures that are never seen on the surface. Gungans dominate these 'underwaterways', using them as a highway of sorts between their surface Holy Places and their underwater cities.

History
It is not known if the aquatic Gungans are the "original" inhabitants of Naboo, but they may have evolved in the interior underground seas or the swamplands.

What is known is that a pre-Gungan humanoid civilization did live on the surface tens of thousands of years ago, leaving monuments and ruins scattered throughout the planet. The largest of these ruins, located on the northern edge of the Lianorm Swamp, was identified as the Gungan Sacred Place. Gungans view these ruins as sacred, and their builders as the "Elders" of the planet. Eventually both Gungan and Human Naboo scientists agree that the end of the "Elder" civilization may be the result of the "Elders" not living in harmony with nature.

Human colonization
Gungans dominated Naboo for a great time, though largely keeping to the swamps and waterways; the mountains and grasslands they considered 'desert-like'. In 3951 BBY (Before the Battle of Yavin), human refugees began fleeing violent revolution on their core world planet of Grizmallt.  The Grizmallt leader, Queen Elsinore den Tasia, sponsored a fleet of three ships (Beneficent Tasia, Mother Vima and Constant) to colonize new worlds, commanded by the explorer Kwilaan. Elsinore den Tasia had the Naboo moon of Tasia named in her honor. Kwilaan's fleet eventually found and crash landed on the planet of Naboo in approximately 3900 BBY, where they permanently settled in the mountains and great grass plains. Some believe that Naboo was originally a Gungan word for "plainsfolk". Cultural differences led to tension between the two peoples—but direct conflict was rare. Over time there was more conflict between the various human settlements than between humans and Gungans.

The human culture of Naboo remained largely pastoral and nomadic, though urban centers developed. Deeja Peak in the Gallo Mountains developed as one of the first human settlements on the planet, keeping a degree of political power there. Keren and Theed both developed as farming communities whose over-production of foodstuffs provided for a large leisure class. Keren eventually became the commercial hub while Theed became more aristocratic. Kaadara developed as a coastal town for the few Nabooan fisherman (not to be confused with nabooian). Moenia was the only human colony built in the traditional Gungan homelands of the Lianorm Swamps.

The Naboo developed into a classic feudal society with a hereditary noble class and common folk, though unlike most feudal societies, there is no record of a subservient serf class. Naboo city-states traded with each other and with the Gungans. Generally the city-states acknowledged a ceremonial "High King"—a position that at times rotated between the city-state princes, though at other times was vested in a royal house. This ceremonial position was largely powerless and a form of peerage democracy evolved.

King Narmele the Explorer colonized Naboo's swampy moon of Rori sometime around 2000 BBY. A city there still bears his name. Some scientists contend that earlier colonists settled Rori before the Narmele colony, but if this is true, no trace of them has been found.  Naboo has two other moons, the water-moon Ohma D'un (later colonised jointly by both Naboo humans and Gungans after the Battle of Naboo) and the barren grey ice-moon of Tasia (named after the Grizmallt Queen who sponsored the original colonial mission).

Naboo culture also includes a strong sense of family in each of the households of Naboo, from commoners up through the royal family. Wives had an extreme sense of loyalty for their husbands and those found to be guilty of adultery were known to be executed.

Naboo during the Old Republic and the Rise of the Empire

In 1,000 BBY a crisis led to a large scale conflict engulfing all the human Naboo city states, though there was no evidence of Gungan participation. Theed's King, Jafan, ended the conflict, uniting all Nabooans under his leadership by 830 BBY. Jafan ushered in the "Great Time of Peace" and Theed became the Royal Capital, eclipsing Deeja Peak. Still provincial and little-populated, the Naboo remained wary of off-world influences. Under the Jafan dynasty, Theed became a showplace of decorative architecture and dazzling craftsmanship, such as the Naboo royal starship and the royal palace at Theed. (Note: the Theed royal palace in the films is a detailed physical miniature model and sometimes computer generated exterior, but the interior was filmed at Caserta Palace in Italy). The forecourt to the palace features statues of Naboo philosophers. The Jafan Dynasty reigned as hereditary rulers until the last of their line expired (circa 150 BBY). Since then the position of monarch has been an elected post, with a fluid constitution that would allow for hereditary rulership to be vested in a noble dynasty if the people so desired.

By King Veruna's reign, 47 BBY, Naboo had become a major player in the galactic plasma energy trade market. Long known as a source of plasma (the energy source that powers everything from simple lights on Queen Amidala's robes, to great Gungan underwater cities and capital starships), high grade plasma veins were discovered below the streets of Theed. This led King Veruna (47–30 BBY) and (then) Senator Palpatine to build a great plasma mining and refining facility in the heart of the capital. The Banking Guild financed the construction. As the Naboo traditionally held an aversion to off world trade they agreed to have the powerful Trade Federation buy the plasma at a fixed price. The Federation however took advantage of the Naboo's lack of interstellar commercial experience and sold the plasma for greatly marked-up prices — selling the Naboo short.

The Naboo protested and wished to be free of the contract. King Veruna, never wanting the trade agreement with the Federation in the first place, sensed the upcoming military conflict. Veruna expanded the role of the Space Fighter Corps and had the N-1 starfighter squadron organized. Theed Hangar was built next to the refining station to house the new military forces. This move was unpopular on Naboo and with Senator Palpatine as these precautions were perceived as provocative overture. With the people and the senator unhappy with his military expansion, Veruna was forced to abdicate in favor of the Princess Padme Naberrie. Later, Veruna would be assassinated while in exile. Taking Amidala as her Name of State, the young Queen, Padme, promised to end the conflict without violence.

Once in power Queen Amidala opened negotiations with the Trade Federation. However, the Federation was scandalized by Naboo's resistance to its authority, which coincided with a Galactic Republic Senate tax on interstellar trade. Both actions were perceived by Federation leadership as threatening to their commercial interests and power. The Federation answered with a military blockade of Naboo, with the aim of forcing Naboo into subservience and to hopefully intimidate the Senate into repealing the taxation measure. The Federation leadership was secretly advised, and manipulated, by the Sith Lord Darth Sidious.

The Jedi Knights Qui-Gon Jinn and Obi-Wan Kenobi were sent to mediate, but were unsuccessful. Naboo fell quickly; though they had a powerful Armed Corps, the Royal Advisory Council held off action until all negotiations failed. The Naboo government and citizens were captured and were to be held in detention camps outside the cities. Soon rescued by Jinn and Kenobi, Queen Amidala left Naboo to personally seek aid in the Galactic Senate. Captain Panaka and others were to organize a resistance movement in the meantime.

Once on Coruscant, Queen Amidala addressed the senate. The Federation had powerful and rich allies, and all the Queen could do was to call for a "Vote of No Confidence" in the senate leadership of Supreme Chancellor Valorum. In this she hoped to force a change for a more favorable chancellorship. The Queen returned to her homeworld to lead the resistance herself. Once home, Queen Amidala sought the aid of the reclusive Gungans, pleading for joint action against a common enemy. The Gungans agreed to an alliance and led an army against the Federation's mechanical forces. Captain Panaka was able to organize the Space Fighter Corps to their fighters, and launch a last effort against the Federation capital ship. The Fighter Corps destroyed the Trade Federation capital ship which shut off all of the B1 Battle Droids and the Trade Federation leaders Nute Gunray and Rune Haako were captured. Qui-Gon Jinn was killed during the battle, but ultimately the Naboo & Gungan Alliance was able to defeat the Federation. For her heroic effort the Naboo people wished to alter the constitution allowing for Padmé Amidala, and possibly her heirs, to reign for life. Padmé Amidala declined the honor.

After serving the maximum two 4-year terms, Padmé Amidala was replaced by Queen Jamillia (24–20 BBY). Jamillia asked for Padmé Amidala to continue serving Naboo as its Senator. Padmé Amidala "couldn't refuse the Queen", and returned to politics after a brief respite. Jar Jar Binks was also appointed as the alternate Senator, becoming the first Gungan to represent the planet of Naboo. Most of the prejudices of both species disappeared when Amidala and Boss Nass managed to unite both species during the Battle of Naboo.

Galactic Republic Senate politics was a new forum for Padmé Amidala. In the meantime Palpatine, a Naboo himself, remained Supreme Chancellor of the Republic, and his hard-line stances were generally supported by a Naboo still rebuilding after occupation. Though many on Naboo and in the Galactic Senate wished for a centralized executive, Padmé Amidala voted again and again against the Military Creation Act, which would allow for the Senate to raise a standing military to serve at the discretion of the Supreme Chancellor of the Republic. Padmé Amidala, however, was outmaneuvered and — after a proposal by Representative Jar Jar Binks' for the granting of "emergency powers" to the Chancellor — a military was created to counter the Separatist movement. During the Clone Wars, the Confederacy of Independent Systems (including the Trade Federation) launched an unsuccessful campaign of invasion and conquest against Naboo.

Imperial Naboo
Following the rise of the Empire, Queen Apailana became outspoken against the new regime.  After diplomatic negotiations failed between Naboo and the Empire, Apailana began exploring military options, and harboring Jedi in direct violation of Order 66.  She would be assassinated by the elite 501st Legion, aka Vader's Fist, establishing Imperial control of the planet.

In years to come, the Naboo would generally support the positions of Chancellor and later Emperor Palpatine, including the establishment of the Empire, thus becoming an Imperial satellite state. Many Naboo would serve in the Imperial Services and Captain Panaka would become an aide to the Emperor, and later it would become imperial Naboo.

Popular Queen Kylantha would reign throughout the Imperial years. Kylantha appointed Padmé Amidala's niece, Pooja Naberrie, to the Imperial Senate. There, Pooja would be a contemporary of her cousin, Princess Leia of Alderaan, but they would not know of each other's biological relationship until 36 years after the Battle of Yavin. Kylantha was not a supporter of the old Republic, but neither was she an Imperial proponent. Kylantha refused to alter the democratic structure of the Naboo constitution. It is believed Kylantha was secretly pro-Rebellion, despite being appointed by the Empire after Apailana's assassination.

Star Wars: Shattered Empire reveals that shortly after the Battle of Endor, the Empire used a superweapon to negatively affect the planet's weather. Leia was visiting her mother's home world at the time of the attack.

Royal traditions

Names of state
Often when a Nabooan enters into political life, he or she adopts a "Name of State". This name is used for public occasions and represents the honor and dignity of the office one chooses. Padmé Naberrie adopted the anonymous Name of State "Amidala" when she became Princess of Theed (34-32 BBY) and later,  Queen of the Naboo (32-24 BBY). Padmé retained the name Amidala when she became Naboo's Senator for the Galactic Republic (23-19 BBY).

Scar of Remembrance
The Scar of Remembrance is used as part of the ruler of the planet Naboo's make-up.  It is a symbol of remembrance of the days before the "Great Time of Peace", which had been brought about by King Jafan, the ruler who united Naboo.  Also worn by Naboo's monarchs as part of their makeup are the coloured twin cheek-spots of "Balance" and "Symmetry".

Known monarchs of Naboo
 King Narmele (c. 2,000 BBY)
 Queen Yarm (c. 500 years before Queen Amidala)
 King Jafan (c. 532 BBY)
 King Tapalo (65 BBY – 46 BBY)
 King Veruna (47 BBY – 30 BBY)
 Queen Amidala (32 BBY – 24 BBY)
 Queen Jamillia (24 BBY – 22 BBY)
 Queen Neeyutnee (22 BBY – 20 BBY) - Clone Wars Era
 Queen Apailana (20 BBY – 18 BBY)
 Queen Kylantha (18 BBY – throughout the Imperial era)
 Queen Sosha Soruna (4 ABY -)

Known senators of Naboo
 Senator Vidar Kim (? BBY – 52 BBY)
 Senator Sheev Palpatine (52 BBY – 32 BBY)
 Senator Padmé Amidala (22 BBY – 19 BBY)
 Senator Jar Jar Binks (19 BBY – 6 BBY)
 Senator Pooja Naberrie (6 BBY– 0 BBY)
 Senator Thadlé Berenko (? ABY - 34 ABY)

See also
 List of Star Wars planets and moons

References

Expanded Universe source materials:
 Inside the Worlds of Star Wars: Episode I, The Complete Guide To the Incredible Locations From the Phantom Menace, Kristin Lund. 2000. DK Publishers, INC.
 Star Wars Episode I: The Visual Dictionary, David West Reynolds. 1999. DK Publishers, INC.
 A Guide To the Star Wars Universe, Third Edition, Bill Slavicsek. The Ballantine Publishing Group.
 Prima's Official Strategy Guide: Star Wars Galaxies, an Empire Divided, 2003. Prima Games, a division of Random House, Inc.
 Star Wars Galaxies: An Empire Divided in-game source material and Sony Online Entertainment.

Moons of Naboo
Canon
2 moons in appearance.
Onoam
No-one knows of Onoam's orbital position, but it was known to host second homes to Sector Governor Quarsh Panaka and Queen Dalné. Later, Senator Leia Organa came and established a mine. The Grid Coordinates were 0-17, but no-one knows its XYZ coordinates.

Appearances
 Star Wars: Episode I – The Phantom Menace
 Star Wars: Episode II – Attack of the Clones
 Star Wars: Episode III – Revenge of the Sith
 Star Wars: Episode VI – Return of the Jedi (2004 edition)
 Star Wars Galactic Battlegrounds
 Star Wars Galactic Battlegrounds: Clone Campaigns
 Star Wars: Battle for Naboo (videogame)
 Lego Star Wars
 Star Wars Battlefront
 Star Wars Battlefront II
 Angry Birds Star Wars II

Theme park attraction
Naboo also appeared in the theme park attraction Star Tours - The Adventures Continue in Disney's Hollywood Studios in Walt Disney World Resort in Orlando, Florida and Disneyland Park in Disneyland Resort in Anaheim, California.

External links
 
 

Star Wars planets
Fictional elements introduced in 1999

de:Orte aus Star Wars#Naboo